McGettigan is an Irish surname found in County Donegal, Republic of Ireland and County Londonderry, Northern Ireland. They were a sept of the Clan Diarmaid of the Cenél nEógain branch of the Northern Uí Néill. Notable people with the surname include:

Charlie McGettigan (born 1950), Irish singer, winner of Eurovision Song Contest 1994
Daniel McGettigan (1815–1887), Irish Catholic prelate
Ian McGettigan, Canadian rock musician
Larry McGettigan (1952–1994), English footballer
Leslie McGettigan, Irish Gaelic footballer and brother of Paul
Paul McGettigan (born 1950s), Irish Gaelic footballer and brother of Leslie
Roisin McGettigan (born 1980), Irish long-distance runner

Surnames of Irish origin
Anglicised Irish-language surnames